Botany Worsted Mills Historic District is located in Passaic, Passaic County, New Jersey. The district was added to the National Register of Historic Places on July 26, 1991.

References

Buildings and structures in Passaic, New Jersey
Industrial buildings and structures on the National Register of Historic Places in New Jersey
National Register of Historic Places in Passaic County, New Jersey
Historic districts on the National Register of Historic Places in New Jersey
New Jersey Register of Historic Places
Textile mills in the United States